In Canada, an Indian band or band, sometimes referred to as a First Nation band or simply a First Nation, is the basic unit of government for those peoples subject to the Indian Act (i.e. status Indians or First Nations). Bands are typically small groups of people: the largest in the country, the Six Nations of the Grand River First Nation had 22,294 members in September 2005, and many have a membership below 100 people. Each First Nation is typically represented by a band council chaired by an elected chief, and sometimes also a hereditary chief. As of 2013, there were 614 bands in Canada. Membership in a band is controlled in one of two ways: for most bands, membership is obtained by becoming listed on the Indian Register maintained by the government. As of 2013, there were 253 First Nations which had their own membership criteria, so that not all status Indians are members of a band.

Bands can be united into larger regional groupings called tribal councils. A treaty council or treaty association, has additional meaning and historically in most provinces represents signatory bands of treaty areas. British Columbia is an exception as treaties in most of the province have not been completed. There the treaty councils have been formed in order to negotiate future treaty claims. Another emerging type of organization in British Columbia is the chiefs' council, such as the St'át'timc Chiefs Council. These councils unite bands that are not included in tribal councils with those that are in tribal councils.

Bands also typically belong to one or more kinds of provincial council or similar organization. They also belong to the pan-Canadian Assembly of First Nations (formerly called the Native Indian Brotherhood), chaired by a leader elected by the bands, each chief having one vote, rather than at-large by individual band members. Bands are, to an extent, the governing body for their Indian reserves. Many First Nations also have large off-reserve populations whom the band government also represents; it may also deal with non-members who live on reserve or work for the band.

Non-status Indians, Métis, and Inuit are not part of the system of band governments and reserves. This is one of the major differences between their legal and social situation in relation to the federal government and that of First Nations governed by band councils.  The courts have ruled that constitutional reference to "Indians" (section 91(24) of the Constitution Act, 1867) does apply to the Inuit (Reference Re Eskimos 1939) as well as to Métis and non-status Indians (Daniels v. Canada 2013), but the relations of these groups with the federal government are not governed by the terms of the Indian Act.

Band
In Canada, the elected government of a First Nations band, consisting of a chief and councillors. Many bands, especially in British Columbia, control multiple Indian reserves, that is, multiple parcels of land. Although bands have considerable control over their reserve land, legally neither the band itself nor its members hold aboriginal land title. Rather, the land is held in trust for the band by the Crown.

The term band is historically related to the anthropological term band society, but as a legal and administrative unit the band need not correspond to a band in this sense. Some bands draw their members from two or more ethnic groups due to the disruption of traditional ways by colonization and/or the administrative convenience of Canada, or by consensual alliances between such groups, some pre-dating the Indian Act.

The functioning of a band is controlled by the Indian Act, the legislation that defines the position of status Indians. The band government is controlled by a chief councillor and council. The number of councillors is determined by the number of band members, with a minimum of two in addition to the chief councillor. The Indian Act specifies procedures for the election of the chief councillor and council. Some bands make use of a policy provision (called 'custom election', which allows them to exempt themselves from these requirements in order to follow traditional procedures for the choice of leaders. This is a matter of controversy. Proponents argue that it allows First Nations to adapt the externally defined system to their traditions. Sometimes this means that 'hereditary' leaders become the chief councillor. Opponents argue that custom systems are frequently not traditional and that, traditional or not, they are unfair and undemocratic and have the effect of preserving the power of corrupt cliques. In many cases they exclude women and also exclude hereditary leaders. The term "Chief" refers to a chief councillor: this individual is not necessarily a hereditary chief or leader, though some are.

Although the current policy of the Crown–Indigenous Relations and Northern Affairs Canada (CIRNAC) is to treat band governments as largely autonomous, under the Indian Act band council resolutions have no effect unless endorsed by the Minister of Crown–Indigenous Relations.

In addition to the chief and council system mandated by the Indian Act, some bands have a traditional system of government that retains considerable influence. In some cases the two systems have come to an accommodation, such as the Office of the Hereditary Chiefs of the Wet'suwet'en. In other cases the two are in conflict.

Tribal council
Two or more bands may unite to form a tribal council. Tribal councils have no independent status; they draw their powers entirely from their member bands. What powers are delegated to the tribal council and which services are provided centrally by the tribal council varies according to the wishes of the member bands.

Other organizations
In addition to tribal councils, bands may create joint organizations for particular purposes, such as providing social services or health care. For example, in the central interior of British Columbia, Carrier Sekani Family Services provides social services for a dozen bands. CSFS was originally a part of the Carrier Sekani Tribal Council but is now a separate organization. Its members include bands that are not members of CSTC.

During treaty negotiations, such as those attempted by the BC provincial government in the form of the British Columbia Treaty Process, bands claims are coordinated and negotiated, if negotiated, by treaty councils. The composition of these may correspond to the local tribal council, such as the Ktunaxa Kinbasket Tribal Council vs the Ktunaxa Kinbasket Treaty Council. But in that particular case American tribal governments belong to the former tribal council but not to the treaty council. Others, such as the Maa-nulth Treaty Association or the Temexw Treaty Group, span different tribal councils and individual bands, covering more than one ethnic group.  Another organization called a chiefs council may include bands that belong to one or more tribal councils and also individual bands that belong to none. For instance, the St'át'timc Chiefs Council serves as a common voice for all Stʼatʼimc and formally does not acknowledge Crown sovereignty.

In other provinces, where treaties already exist, a treaty group or treaty association is composed of bands already signatory to existing treaties, such as Treaty 6 and Treaty 8.

Non-status
There are also organized groups of Indian descent whose Indian status is not recognized by Canada. These are often the descendants of bands considered by Canada to have become extinct. Such groups have no official existence but may nonetheless have some degree of political organization. The Sinixt, who are now based mostly in Washington state as part of the Confederated Tribes of the Colville Reservation, but have a small group of representatives based at Vallican, BC, are an example. They are a politically active group with no legally recognized band government in Canada. Some of their members have federally recognized Indian tribal status (in the US) and ongoing land claims in British Columbia.

National organizations
In addition to tribal councils and special-purpose service organizations, bands may form larger organizations. The largest is the Assembly of First Nations, which represents the chiefs of over 600 bands throughout Canada. There are also some regional organizations. The Chief of the AFN is referred to as the National Chief. The AFN also has a Vice-Chief for each region.

Provincial and territorial organizations
In British Columbia, the First Nations Summit represents 203 bands in the province that are engaged in treaty negotiations with Canada and British Columbia. An older organization, the Union of British Columbia Indian Chiefs, represents the bands that reject the current British Columbia Treaty Process. Some bands belong to both. In Ontario, the Chiefs of Ontario serve as the provincial-level organization; in Saskatchewan, the provincial-level grouping is the Federation of Sovereign Indigenous Nations.

Inuit and Métis
From a constitutional point of view, not all indigenous people are First Nations people. In addition to Indians, the Constitution (section 35.2) recognizes two other indigenous groups: the Inuit and the Métis. The national Inuit organization is Inuit Tapiriit Kanatami. The self-governing territory of Nunavut is inhabited primarily by Inuit. The status of the Métis remains unresolved but has been the subject of negotiations in the early 21st century, which has resulted in the Métis Nation Framework Agreement between various Métis organizations and Canada. These have been negotiated as recently as 2019, for instance, by the Métis Nation of Ontario, the Métis Nation—Saskatchewan, and the Métis Nation of Alberta.

See also

 Classification of Indigenous peoples of the Americas
 List of Canadian Aboriginal leaders
 List of First Nations band governments
 List of Indian reserves in Canada

References

External links
Assembly of First Nations
Association of Iroquois and Allied Indians
Chiefs of Ontario
Department of Indian and Northern Affairs
First Nations of Treaty 3
First Nations Summit (British Columbia)
Institute for Indigenous Government
Inuit Tapirisaat of Canada
Metis Nation Framework Agreement
Nishnawbe-Aski Nation
Union of British Columbia Indian Chiefs
Union of Ontario Indians

First Nations governments